Kurtajpur, or Kurtalpur, is a village in Sitapur district in the Indian state of Uttar Pradesh.

Economy 

Its villagers mostly work in agriculture. Others occupy governmental positions (doctors, engineers, and teachers). Few inhabitants of Kurtajpur have graduate degrees.

Kurtajpur is the fastest developing of the neighboring villages.

Villages in Sitapur district